Daniel Skalický (born February 5, 1991) is a Czech professional ice hockey player. He is currently playing for HC Bílí Tygři Liberec of the Czech Extraliga.

Skalický made his Czech Extraliga debut playing with HC Bílí Tygři Liberec during the 2009-10 Czech Extraliga season.

References

External links

1991 births
Living people
HC Bílí Tygři Liberec players
Czech ice hockey forwards
Sportspeople from Liberec
HC Benátky nad Jizerou players